Mantamaru (also referred to as Jameson) is a medium-sized Aboriginal community, located in the Goldfields–Esperance region of Western Australia, within the Shire of Ngaanyatjarraku.

Native title 
The community is located within the determined Ngaanyatjarra Lands (Part A) (WAD6004/04) native title claim area.

Town planning 
Mantamaru Layout Plan No.1 has been prepared in accordance with State Planning Policy 3.2 Aboriginal Settlements. Layout Plan No. was endorsed by the community on 7 October 2008.

Notes

External links
 Native Title Claimant application summary

Towns in Western Australia
Shire of Ngaanyatjarraku
Aboriginal communities in Goldfields-Esperance